BAP Coronel Bolognesi was a scout cruiser of the Peruvian Navy, the lead ship of its class. Along with its sister ship Almirante Grau, Coronel Bolognesi was one of Peru's two most powerful warships for the first half of the twentieth century. The ship was named for Francisco Bolognesi, a hero of the country for his service in the War of the Pacific.

References 

Almirante Grau-class cruisers of the Peruvian Navy
Ships built in Barrow-in-Furness
1906 ships